Barlow Peak, elevation , is an isolated mountain peak in the Big Game Ridge section of southwest Yellowstone National Park, south of the Continental Divide, in the U.S. state of Wyoming. Barlow Peak was named by geologist Arnold Hague in 1885 for Captain John W. Barlow, an early topographical engineer who helped to map the park.

See also
Mountains and mountain ranges of Yellowstone National Park

Notes

Mountains of Wyoming
Mountains of Yellowstone National Park
Mountains of Teton County, Wyoming